Coahoma Independent School District is a public school district based in Coahoma, Texas (USA), founded in 1899 in order to educate the children of local pioneers and settlers.  The district covers eastern Howard and western Mitchell  counties.

In 2009, the school district was rated "academically acceptable" by the Texas Education Agency.

Schools

Coahoma ISD has three schools:

Coahoma High School (Grades 9-12)
Coahoma Junior High School (Grades 6-8)
Coahoma Elementary School (Grades PK-5).

References

External links
Coahoma ISD
Coahoma ISD District Data (TEA)

School districts in Howard County, Texas
School districts established in 1899